Nassa situla is a species of sea snail, a marine gastropod mollusk in the family Muricidae.

Description
The shell grows to a length of 35 mm

Distribution
This species is distributed in the Red Sea, the Gulf of Aden and the Gulf of Oman.

References

 Houart R. (1996) The genus Nassa Röding 1798 in the Indo-West Pacific (Gastropoda: Prosobranchia: Muricidae: Rapaninae). Archiv für Molluskenkunde 126(1–2):51–63

External links
 

Muricidae
Gastropods described in 1846
Nassa (gastropod)